Goranba is a locality in the Western Downs Region, Queensland, Australia.

Geography 
The Glenmorgan railway line traverses the locality from east (Weranga) to west (Tara) and is served by Goranba railway station.

History 
The name Goranba is an Aboriginal word referring to a fight over ownership of a tree.

Goranba Provisional School opened February 1925 in a newly constructed hall. In July 1929 it was decided to combine the schools at Perthton and Goranba in single location. In December 1929, the school building at Perthton was relocated to Goranba to establish Goranba State School on a new . It closed circa 1941. In March 1943 the community requested that the Goranba school building be relocated to Warra-Kogan Road near the Myra Meadows property, a site donated by Andrew Watt Adams, which was approved in October 1943.

References 

Western Downs Region
Localities in Queensland